Bexley Grammar School is a co-educational grammar school with academy status in Welling, in the London Borough of Bexley, UK. It takes boys and girls aged 11–18 who have passed the eleven plus exam.

History

Founded in 1955, Bexley Grammar School was opened by Sir Edward Heath, the local Member of Parliament at the time, after whom the Heath Building (completed in 2000) is named. Heath attended the school's Golden Jubilee celebrations shortly before his death in 2005. The school became a specialist Language College in September 2002 and a specialist college in Science and Mathematics in 2008. The school was then awarded foundation school status, before converting to an academy in January 2011. The school continues to specialise in languages, science and mathematics.

There have been five headmasters in the school's history. The third, Roderick MacKinnon, was replaced by John Welsh, who retired at the beginning of Easter 2014 and was replaced by Stephen Elphick.

Academics
The school entrance examination is the eleven plus exam taken by prospective pupils in September of Year 6. Candidates who live in Bexleyheath must come in the top 120 and candidates who live in the wider catchment area (10 miles from the Broadway Shopping Centre, Bexleyheath) must come within the top 60. Students who apply to enter the school between the years 7 and 11 are required to pass examinations in English, Mathematics, Science, and a Modern Foreign Language.

To enter the Sixth Form students must achieve higher than GCSE grade C in all compulsory subjects and at least GCSE grade B in selected subjects. Current pupils must achieve more than six A*–Bs (including Maths and English) in their GCSEs to continue their studies in Sixth Form.

In the 2016 academic year, 100% of pupils attained 5 GCSE grades A* to C. 99.1% of the A-level grades were A* to D. The school began offering the International Baccalaureate (IB) in Sixth Form in 2003, alongside A Levels. From September 2017, students in the sixth form were only able to study the IB, as the school stopped teaching A Levels.

The school's last OFSTED inspection was in 2022.

Premises
The school has expanded into new buildings over time; Main (M), Jubilee (J), Golden Jubilee (was the Danson building but was replaced in 2005 by the current building), Heath (H), Le Feuvre (L), Music (Mu), Jubilee extension (J) (2002–03) and Golden Jubilee (G). Some confusion can occur with the Jubilee extension, which was originally the G building and the 2005 extension of the Main building. Recently, the SEN block (S) has been added on the end of the school on the side of the PE block and a new sixth form centre has been built as an extension to the Le Feuvre building. In 2017, a further extension to the school added a (K) block with a Theatre and sixth form study area.

The school buildings form an internal courtyard area surrounded on all sides except the West, which is a covered area.

The field covers a larger area than the buildings and is surrounded on two sides by Danson Park.

House system
BGS operates a House System involving all years, with around 12 members of staff in each house. All six houses have a "Head of House", who is in charge of organising all house activities, such as inter-house sports competitions. Each house is named after a former member of senior staff that had a notable impact on the school, including:

Collins (Red)
Johnson (Blue)
Kirkman (Yellow)
Prothero (Green)
Mabbs (Purple)
Wellman (Orange) – Added in 2003 due to expansion of the school year intake from five-form entry to seven-form entry.

Notable former pupils
 Stephanie Brind, professional squash player
 Gavin Peacock, former professional footballer
 Matthew Rose, former professional footballer
 Joshua Bradley and Tobi Brown, YouTubers and members of the Sidemen

See also
 London Borough of Bexley
 Grammar schools in the United Kingdom
 List of schools in Bexley

References

Further reading

External links
 Bexley Grammar School website
 Bexley Grammar Ofsted Report
 EduBase

Grammar schools in the London Borough of Bexley
International Baccalaureate schools in England
Educational institutions established in 1955
Academies in the London Borough of Bexley
1955 establishments in England
Specialist science colleges in England
Specialist language colleges in England